Albia may refer to:
 Albia gens, an ancient Roman family
 Albia Terentia, mother of Roman emperor Otho
 Albia Dominica, wife of Roman emperor Valens
 Albia, a medieval name for the river Elbe
 Albia, Iowa, a city in the United States
 Albia, the setting of the Creatures artificial life series of programs